The Hopman Cup was an international eight-team indoor hardcourt tennis tournament that played mixed-gender teams on a country-by-country basis. It was held in Perth, Western Australia each year from 1989 to 2019, before being replaced on the calendar in 2020 by the now defunct ATP Cup. It is set to return in July 2023 in Nice, France.

Format
Unlike other major international team tennis tournaments such as the Davis Cup and the Fed Cup, which are for men or women only, the Hopman Cup is a mixed competition in which male and female players are on combined teams and represent their countries. Players are invited to attend and national coaches are not involved in selecting teams.

The tournament is a sanctioned official event in the calendar of the International Tennis Federation (ITF) but, while individual player results are tallied, they are not regarded as official ATP matches or included in the calculation of ATP or WTA rankings.

Eight nations are selected annually to compete in the Hopman Cup. The "last" team may be decided by play-offs between several nations before competition begins. For the 2007 Hopman Cup however, this did not occur, due to the Asian Qualifying Tournament creating the eighth team.

Each team consists of one male player and one female player. Each match-up between two teams at the event consists of:
one women's singles match
one men's singles match
one mixed doubles match

The eight competing teams are separated into two groups of four (with two teams being seeded) and face-off against each of the other three teams in their group in a round-robin format. The seedings ensure that each group has approximately similar strength. The top team in each group then meet in a final to decide the champions.

If a player is injured then a player of a lower ranking of that nation may be the substitute.

The winning team receives a silver cup perpetual trophy and through 2013 the winning team members were presented with distinctive individual trophies in the shape of a tennis ball.

History
The Hopman Cup was created in 1989. The championship is named in honour of Harry Hopman (1906–1985), an Australian tennis player and coach who guided the country to 15 Davis Cup titles between 1938 and 1969. From the time the Hopman Cup was founded in 1989, it was attended each year by Hopman's widow, his second wife Lucy, who travelled to the tournament from her home in the United States until she died in 2018. 

The 2005/06 Hopman Cup was the first elite-level tennis tournament in which the system was introduced allowing players to challenge point-ending line calls similar to that in clay court tournaments. The challenged calls are immediately reviewed on a large monitor using Hawk-Eye technology. Up to and including 2012, the venue was the Burswood Dome at the Burswood Entertainment Complex. The 20th Hopman Cup, in 2008, was intended to be the last held at the Burswood Dome, however this was extended until 2012 when the new Perth Arena was due for completion. From 2013 to 2019, it was played at the Perth Arena.

From 2014 to 2019, the Hopman Cup tournament director was Paul Kilderry after the resignation of Steve Ayles. Previously, the former Australian tennis player Paul McNamee, who played a key role in the founding of the championships, was the tournament director.

In 2019 for the 31st edition of the tournament, a record crowd of 14,064 witnessed the 2019 Hopman Cup match between United States and Switzerland. Roger Federer and Belinda Bencic won, with Federer becoming the first player to win the tournament three times. He and Belinda Bencic became the first pairing to successfully defend the title, having won it the previous year. The Hopman Cup was not held in 2020 it was replaced with the newly created ATP Cup. ITF president David Haggerty later announced the tournament would return in 2021. After the tournament was unable to be held in 2021, he announced it would return in 2022 instead. In July 2021, it was announced that the tournament would return, and will be played in Nice in 2023.

Telecasts
The Hopman Cup was originally broadcast by the Seven Network until 1994, then by the Australian Broadcasting Corporation (1995–2010). From 2011, a five-year deal to broadcast the competition was signed by Network Ten, a deal that ended abruptly in November 2013. The Seven Network's 7mate channel subsequently picked up the telecasting rights. The Nine Network broadcast the tournament in 2019.

Records and statistics

Finals by year

Performance by team

Consecutive titles
All-time: 2, United States, 2003–2004; Switzerland, 2018−2019
Consecutive finals appearances
All-time: 4, United States, 2001–2004

Participation details

Statistics by team
After 2019 edition

Note 1: Teams with index 2 include results only of lower placed team of every appearance in the tournament in instances where two teams from the same country entered the tournament, while team with no index includes results of higher placed team only.
Note 2: Considering there is an extremely high frequency of retirements due to various reasons w.o. wins/defeats are counted in all statistics.
Note 3: "Y Ent" statistic is not complete. Information about Asian Hopman Cup, a qualifying tournament that ran from 2006 until 2009 and granted the winners entry into the Hopman Cup the following year, is missing.

Notes

Asian Hopman Cup

References

External links

Hopman Cup
Recurring sporting events established in 1989
Recurring sporting events disestablished in 2019
International sports competitions hosted by Australia
Tennis tournaments in Australia
Sports competitions in Perth, Western Australia
Hard court tennis tournaments
1989 establishments in Australia
2019 disestablishments in Australia
Annual sporting events in Australia
December sporting events
January sporting events
Mixed doubles tennis
International tennis competitions